The Social Liberals, formerly New Liberals, is an association and a former minor political party in Germany based in Berlin.

The former party was created as a split from the Free Democratic Party (FDP) operating in multiple states, and was founded on 28 September 2014 in Wilhelmsburg, Hamburg.

The association states its distance from the FDP and its economic liberalism, and aims to create a programme based on social liberalism.

The New Liberals form a parliamentary group in the district of Harburg (part of Hamburg) and currently have 3 seats in the assembly.

On 6 January 2015, the Liberal Democrats, the New Liberals and another small party declared their intent to cooperate with the objective of an eventual merger. The LD still features this prominently, while the New Liberals had since restructured.

On 20 April 2016, a new "group of members and sympathisers of Liberal Democrats and New Liberals in the Saar area" formed as a joint regional representation.

On 7 June 2021, the Social Liberals leadership announced their recommendation to dissolve as a party and to recommend its members to join Volt Deutschland, the German branch of the pan-European party Volt Europa.

Views
The preliminary founding program states that the former party aims for classic social liberal positions. The aim is a “free society, in which every human being is valued in their individuality and is able to unfold”. New central motives of the New Liberals are the introduction of a basic income as well as improvements for “refugees, immigrants, people with disabilities, elderly people, increasingly also families but also job starters”.

References

External links
Official website

2014 establishments in Germany
Political parties established in 2014
Political parties disestablished in 2021
Liberal parties in Germany
Pro-European political parties in Germany